The 2014 Sultan Azlan Shah Cup was the 23rd edition of the Sultan Azlan Shah Cup, a field hockey tournament. It was held in Ipoh, Perak, Malaysia from 13 to 23 March.

As with the previous tournament, six teams competed. India, New Zealand and Pakistan, who competed previously, did not join this edition and were replaced by Canada, China, and South Africa.

Participating nations
Six countries participated in the 2014 tournament:

 (Host)

Umpires

 Javed Shaikh (IND)
 David Sweetman (SCO)
 Ben de Young (AUS)
 Deric Leung (CAN)
 Iskandar Rusli (MAS)
 Shin Dong-yoon (KOR)
 Tao Zhinan (CHN)
 John Wright (RSA)

Results
All times are in Malaysia Standard Time (UTC+08:00).

Pool

Classification

Fifth and sixth place

Third and fourth place

Final

Top goalscorers

Final standings

References
 FIH

External links
Official website

2014
2014 in field hockey
2014 in Malaysian sport
2014 in Australian field hockey
2014 in Canadian sports
2014 in South African sport 
2014 in South Korean sport
2014 in Chinese sport
March 2014 sports events in Asia